Aleksandr Mikhalovich Buturlin (born September 3, 1981) is a Russian professional ice hockey player. He played with HC Spartak Moscow in the Kontinental Hockey League during the 2010–11 KHL season. He was selected by the Montreal Canadiens in the 2nd round (39th overall) of the 1999 NHL Entry Draft.

Career statistics

References

External links 

1981 births
HC Spartak Moscow players
Living people
Montreal Canadiens draft picks
Russian ice hockey right wingers
Ice hockey people from Moscow